Norah Baring (26 November 1905 – 8 February 1985), born Nora Minnie Baker, was an English stage and film actress most famous on screen for portraying "Diana Baring" in the Alfred Hitchcock thriller Murder! (1930). She is also known for playing the female lead in Anthony Asquith's silent thriller A Cottage on Dartmoor (1929). Baring studied art prior to becoming an actress.

Filmography
 Underground (1928)
 Parisiennes (1928)
 The Celestial City (1929)
 The Runaway Princess (1929)
 A Cottage on Dartmoor (1929)
 Murder! (1930)
 Should a Doctor Tell? (1930)
 Two Worlds (1930)
 At the Villa Rose (1930)
 The Lyons Mail (1931)
 Strange Evidence (1933)
 The House of Trent (1933)
Little Stranger (1934)

References

External links

1905 births
1985 deaths
English film actresses
English silent film actresses
20th-century English actresses
Actresses from London